The Agricultural Development Bank of China is a Chinese policy bank under the State Council of the People's Republic of China.   As such, it is responsible for funding projects related to China's economic growth. If the ADBC requires funding for its own operations, its bonds are considered as safe as the Central Bank's bonds, however PBOC or PRC government do not guarantee any kind of borrowings including bonds. It was founded in 1994.

See also
 Banking in China

References

External links 
 Official site (cn)

Banks of China